The 1988–89 Rugby Football League season was the 94th season of professional rugby league football in Britain. Fourteen teams competed from August, 1988 until May, 1989 for the Stones Bitter Championship, Premiership Trophy and Silk Cut Challenge Cup.

Season summary
Springfield Borough (previously Blackpool Borough) relocated were renamed Chorley Borough.

Huddersfield Barracudas reverted to their original name Huddersfield.

Wigan beat Salford 22–17 to win the Lancashire County Cup, and Leeds beat Castleford 33–12 to win the Yorkshire County Cup.

League Tables

Championship final Standings

Second Division Final Standings

Premiership

Challenge Cup

Wigan defeated St. Helens 27-0 in the Challenge Cup Final at Wembley Stadium before a crowd of 78,000. Ellery Hanley, Wigan's loose forward, was awarded the Lance Todd Trophy for his man-of-the-match performance. This was the first time a side had been held scoreless in a Challenge Cup final.

Lancashire Cup

Yorkshire Cup

The following chart excludes any preliminary round fixtures/results

John Player Special Trophy

This tree excludes any preliminary round fixtures

References

Sources
1988-89 Rugby Football League season at wigan.rlfans.com
Great Britain Competitions 1988-1989 at hunterlink.net.au

1988 in English rugby league
1989 in English rugby league
Rugby Football League seasons